Roman Blood is a historical novel by American author Steven Saylor, first published by Minotaur Books in 1991. It is the first book in his Roma Sub Rosa series of mystery novels set in the final decades of the Roman Republic. The main character is the Roman sleuth ares -amon

Plot summary
The year is 80 BC, and the dictator Sulla rules Rome. The young lawyer Cicero is defending Sextus Roscius, a man accused of murdering his own father. (The gruesome Roman punishment for patricide is described.) Cicero hires Gordianus the Finder to discover the truth of the matter. We are introduced to Gordianus' slave, Bethesda, the mute boy Eco, and historical persons such as the plutocrat Marcus Licinius Crassus, the powerful freedman Lucius Cornelius Chrysogonus and Cicero's scribe Marcus Tullius Tiro.

Roma Sub Rosa
1991 American novels
Historical mystery novels
Minotaur Books books
80 BC